Bertolaso is an Italian surname. Notable people with the surname include:

 (1918-2009), Italian aviator
Guido Bertolaso  (born 1950), Italian physician and state functionary

Italian-language surnames